"Robbie Williams: Live at the Albert" is a DVD that was released in December 2001 of the show performed on 10 October 2001; concert that Robbie Williams gave at Royal Albert Hall a month before the release of the album Swing When You're Winning. It has since been certified 6× Platinum in the United Kingdom and 2× Platinum in Germany.

After the end of the first song ("Have You Met Miss Jones?") he gave this emotive message:

The DVD included performances of nearly all of the songs from the album, with performances from Jonathan Wilkes, Jon Lovitz, and Jane Horrocks, as well as a live version of Robbie's 'duet' with Sinatra. Rupert Everett emceed, and Nicole Kidman attended the show, but neither performed their duets featured on the album (They Can't Take That Away From Me and Somethin' Stupid, respectively); these were the only songs from the album which did not feature live. Live at the Albert received a Grammy Award nomination for Best Long Form Video.

On 13 March 2007 (five years after the release), the concert was re-released in High Definition (both in Blu-ray and in HD DVD).

Track listing 
"Intro"
"Have You Met Miss Jones?"
"Mack The Knife"
"Straighten Up and Fly Right"
"Let's Face the Music and Dance"
"Well, Did You Evah!" (feat. Jon Lovitz)
"The Lady is a Tramp"
"Things" (feat. Jane Horrocks)
"One for My Baby"
"Mr. Bojangles"
"I Will Talk and Hollywood Will Listen"
"Do Nothin' Till You Hear from Me"
"Beyond the Sea"
"Me and My Shadow" (feat. Jonathan Wilkes)
"Ain't That a Kick in the Head"
"It Was a Very Good Year" (featuring a video with Frank Sinatra)
"My Way"

Extras 
Well Swung - A behind-the-scenes documentary of the album's recording at Capitol Studios.
Extra unseen footage
Photo gallery
Credits

In the Blu-ray Disc/HD DVD version
Great performance: Robbie in High Definition
They Can't Take That Away From Me - Gallery
Exclusive backstage and aftershow footage

References

Robbie Williams video albums
Live albums recorded at the Royal Albert Hall
2002 video albums
Live video albums
2002 live albums